{{DISPLAYTITLE:C11H13ClN2}}
The molecular formula C11H13ClN2 (molar mass: 208.69 g/mol, exact mass: 208.0767 u) may refer to:

 5-Chloro-αMT (5-Chloro-α-methyltryptamine), or PAL-542
 Epibatidine